Team jumping equestrian at the 2006 Asian Games was held in Doha Equestrian Jumping Arena, Doha, Qatar from December 10 to December 11, 2006.

Schedule
All times are Arabia Standard Time (UTC+03:00)

Results
Legend
EL — Eliminated

References
Results

External links
Official website

Team jumping